Pakistani subnational abbreviations are used by Pakistan Post, currently in code system of two or more capital letters to represent the Administrative units of Pakistan.

Current abbreviations 
The sources of the current abbreviations vary. Some are from the initials of two of the words in the name of a province or territory, while others are from the first and final letter or from the first and some other letters in the name. All of these names are based on the English form of the name.

Usage
These abbreviations are hardly used in postal mail, as most people only tend to write the name of the city/town and not the province. Since there is a five-digit postal code system and only four provinces, writing a provincial abbreviation is not a common practice.

See also 
Administrative units of Pakistan
Pakistan Post
ISO 3166-2:PK

References

Postal system of Pakistan
Lists of abbreviations